The 2021 CONCACAF Gold Cup was an international football tournament held in the United States from 10 July to 1 August 2021. The sixteen participating national teams were required to register a squad of 23 players, of which three have to be goalkeepers. Only players in these squads are eligible to take part in the tournament.

Each national team had to submit a provisional list of up to sixty players (including at least four goalkeepers) to CONCACAF no later than thirty days prior to the start of the tournament and no players could be added after the specified deadline. The final list of 23 players per national team had to be submitted to CONCACAF by 1 July 2021, ten days before the opening match of the tournament. All players in the final list had to be chosen from the respective provisional list. In the event that a player on the submitted final list suffered a serious injury or illness up to 24 hours before the kick-off of his team's first match of the tournament, that player could be replaced, provided that the team doctor and a doctor from the CONCACAF Medical Committee both confirmed that the injury or illness is severe enough to prevent the player's participation in the tournament. The replacement player must come from the provisional list and will be assigned the shirt number of the replaced player.

The twelve national teams that participated in the qualifying stage were also required to submit their provisional and final lists within the deadlines indicated above.

CONCACAF published the provisional lists on 18 June 2021, and the final lists on 1 July 2021. On 19 July 2021, CONCACAF announced that national teams qualified for the knockout stage could replace players in case of serious injury or illness (primarily players who tested positive for SARS‑CoV‑2) confirmed by the CONCACAF Medical Committee until 24 hours before the kick-off of their quarter-finals match. The replacement players must come from the provisional list submitted previously.

The age listed for each player is on 10 July 2021, the first day of the tournament. The numbers of caps and goals listed for each player do not include any matches played after the start of the tournament. The club listed is the club for which the player last played a competitive match before the tournament. The nationality for each club reflects the national association (not the league) to which the club is affiliated. A flag is included for coaches who are of a different nationality than their own national team.

Group A

Mexico
Head coach:  Gerardo Martino

Mexico's 60-man provisional list was announced on 18 June 2021, and was reduced to 45 players on 19 June. The final squad was announced on 1 July 2021. After the team's first group stage match, forward Hirving Lozano withdrew injured and was replaced by Rodolfo Pizarro on 21 July.

El Salvador
Head coach:  Hugo Pérez

El Salvador's 32-man provisional list was announced by CONCACAF on 17 June 2021. The final squad was announced on 1 July 2021. On 7 July, defender Rómulo Villalobos withdrew injured and was replaced by Julio Sibrián.

Before the quarter-finals, on 20 July, forward David Rugamas was ruled out due to a severe flu process and was replaced by defender Miguel Lemus on 21 July.

Guatemala
Head coach:  Rafael Loredo

The following players were included in the Guatemala squad.

Trinidad and Tobago
Head coach: Angus Eve

The following players were included in the Trinidad and Tobago squad.

Group B

United States
Head coach: Gregg Berhalter

The United States' 60-man provisional list was announced by CONCACAF on 17 June 2021. The final squad was announced on 1 July 2021. Before the quarter-finals, defender Walker Zimmerman, who was injured in the team's last group stage match, was replaced by Henry Kessler on 24 July.

Canada
Head coach:  John Herdman

Canada's 60-man provisional list was announced on 18 June 2021. The final squad was announced on 1 July 2021. On 9 July, Alphonso Davies withdrew from the squad due to injury and Cristián Gutiérrez was registered as a replacement. On 10 July 2021, Frank Sturing replaced Scott Kennedy.

Before the quarter-finals, forward Ayo Akinola was ruled out due to an injury and replaced by Tesho Akindele on 23 July.

Martinique
Head coach: Mario Bocaly

Martinique's 35-man provisional list was announced by CONCACAF on 17 June 2021. The final squad was announced on 1 July 2021.

Haiti
Head coach: Jean-Jacques Pierre

The following players were included in the Haiti squad for 2021 CONCACAF Gold Cup qualification.

Group C

Costa Rica
Head coach:  Luis Fernando Suárez

Costa Rica's 60-man provisional list was announced by CONCACAF on 17 June 2021, and was reduced to 27 players on 25 June upon the arrival of new coach Luis Fernando Suárez. The final squad was announced on 1 July 2021. On 5 and 7 July, midfielder Yeltsin Tejeda and defender Bryan Oviedo were withdrawn due to injuries and replaced by Jefferson Brenes and Luis Díaz respectively.

Before the quarter-finals, goalkeeper Patrick Sequeira was ruled out due to an injury and replaced by Kevin Briceño on 21 July.

Jamaica
Head coach: Theodore Whitmore

Jamaica's 60-man provisional list was announced on 19 June 2021. The final squad was announced on 1 July 2021. On 8 July, forward Javon East, withdrew injured and was replaced by Andre Gray.

Suriname
Head coach: Dean Gorré

Suriname's 36-man provisional list was announced by CONCACAF on 17 June 2021. The final squad was announced on 25 June.

Guadeloupe
Head coach: Jocelyn Angloma

The following players were included in the Guadeloupe squad for 2021 CONCACAF Gold Cup qualification.

Group D

Honduras
Head coach:  Fabián Coito

Honduras's 56-man provisional list was announced by CONCACAF on 17 June 2021. The final squad was announced on 30 June 2021. On 9 July, Éver Alvarado withdrew due to injury, and was replaced by Raúl Santos. On 12 July, Michaell Chirinos withdrew due to injury and was replaced by Franklin Flores. On 19 July 2021, Kevin López replaced Alberth Elis due to injury. On 21 July 2021, Roger Rojas replaced Carlos Fernández due to positive test for SARS-CoV-2.

Panama
Head coach:  Thomas Christiansen

Panama's 47–man provisional list was announced by CONCACAF on 17 June 2021, and was reduced to 25 players on 25 June. The final squad was announced on 1 July 2021. On 6 July 2021, Cecilio Waterman was replaced by Rolando Blackburn due to positive test on SARS-CoV-2. On 8 July 2021, Aníbal Godoy and Andrés Andrade were withdrawn due to injuries and replaced by Abdiel Ayarza and Roderick Miller.

Grenada
Head coach:  Michael Findlay

Grenada's 59-man provisional list was announced by CONCACAF on 17 June 2021. The final squad was announced on 1 July 2021.

Qatar
Head coach:  Félix Sánchez

Qatar's 60-man provisional list was announced by CONCACAF on 17 June 2021. The final squad was announced on 1 July.

Player representation

By club nationality

The above table is the same when it comes to league representation, with only the following exceptions:
 The English league system has 22 representatives, including one player from Wales-based Cardiff City.
 The American league system has 78 representatives, including eleven players from Canada-based CF Montréal, Toronto FC and Vancouver Whitecaps FC.

No national team had all its players from the nation's club teams, except invitee Qatar. Every national team also had at least one player from a club of its nation, except Curaçao.

Notes

References

CONCACAF Gold Cup squads
Squads
2021 in American soccer